Vijay Sethupathi is an Indian actor, producer, screenwriter, lyricist and playback singer who works mainly in Tamil films. He began his career in 1996 by playing small uncredited roles in films, before his first lead role in Thenmerku Paruvakaatru (2010), under Seenu Ramasamy's direction. 2012 marked a turning point in Sethupathi's career; all his three releases were critical and commercial successes, resulting in a rise in his popularity.

He was first seen in a negative role in Sundarapandian which featured M. Sasikumar in the lead role, and then played the lead roles in the directorial debuts of Karthik Subbaraj and Balaji Tharaneetharan, the thriller film Pizza (2012) and the comedy entertainer Naduvula Konjam Pakkatha Kaanom (2012), respectively.

Film

As an actor 
All films are in Tamil language unless otherwise noted.

Other crew positions

Television

Music video appearances

Notes

References

External links 
 

Indian filmographies
Male actor filmographies